Anuchit Pakdeekaew (born 29 September 1996) is a member of the Thailand men's national volleyball team who plays as a Middle Blocker.

Clubs 
  Nongkungsriwittayakan School (2013)
  Krungkao Air Force  (2014–2015)
  Chonburi (2015–2016)
  Air force (2016–present)

Awards

Individual
 2018–19 Thailand League "Best Middle Blocker"

Clubs 
 2015–16 Thailand League -  Bronze Medal, with Chonburi E-Tech Air Force
 2016–17 Thailand League -  Champion, with Air Force
 2017 Thai–Denmark Super League -  Runner-up, with Air Force
 2017–18 Thailand League -  Champion, with Air Force
 2018 Thai–Denmark Super League -  Champion, with Air Force
 2017–18 Thailand League -  Champion, with Air Force
 2019 Thai–Denmark Super League -  Runner-Up, with Air Force

References

1996 births
Living people
Anuchit Pakdeekaew
Anuchit Pakdeekaew
Anuchit Pakdeekaew
Southeast Asian Games medalists in volleyball
Competitors at the 2017 Southeast Asian Games
Volleyball players at the 2018 Asian Games
Competitors at the 2019 Southeast Asian Games
Anuchit Pakdeekaew
Middle blockers
Anuchit Pakdeekaew
Anuchit Pakdeekaew